Six Flying Dragons is a South Korean television series starring  Yoo Ah-in, Kim Myung-min, Shin Se-kyung, Byun Yo-han, Yoon Kyun-sang and Chun Ho-jin. It aired on SBS on Mondays and Tuesdays at 22:00 for 50 episodes beginning on October 5, 2015, as part of SBS 25th anniversary special. The drama serves as a loose prequel to Deep Rooted Tree.

Title
The Korean title of the series is in Old Korean. Nareushya is a native Korean word, which translates to nara oreuda (날아 오르다) or "soar up to the sky" in modern Korean. Thus, the literal translation of the title is "six dragons soaring up to the sky" (여섯 마리의 용이 날아오르셔서).

Plot
The story tells about the foundation of the Joseon dynasty in the Korean Peninsula, and the ambitions, success and conflicts of several real and fictional characters, with a focus on the young Yi Bang-won.

Cast

The Six Dragons 
 Yoo Ah-in as Yi Bang-won (later King Taejong)
 Nam Da-reum as young Yi Bang-won
 Kim Myung-min as Sambong Jeong Do-jeon
 Shin Se-kyung as Boon-yi
 Lee Re as young Boon-yi
 Yoon Yoo-sun as old Boon-yi (cameo)
 Byun Yo-han as Yi Bang-ji, the best swordsman in the Three Kingdoms
 Yoon Chan-young as young Ddang-sae
 Yoon Kyun-sang as Moo-hyul, the best swordsman in Joseon
 Baek Seung-hwan as young Moo-hyul
 Chun Ho-jin as Yi Seong-gye (later King Taejo)

Supporting characters

People around Yi Bang-won 
 Gong Seung-yeon as Min Da-kyung (later Queen Wongyeong), Yi Bang-won's wife
 Nam Da-reum as Yi Do (later King Sejong the Great), Yi Bang-won's third son
 Min Sung-wook as Jo Young-kyu, Yi Bang-won's bodyguard
 Jo Young-jin as Min Je, Yi Bang-won's father-in-law
 Cha Yong-hak as Yi Suk-beon
 Choi Dae-hoon as Sagok Jo Mal-saeng

People around Jeong Do-jeon 
 Kim Eui-sung as Poeun Jeong Mong-ju
 Jin Seon-kyu as Nam Eun
 Lee Jeong-heon as Shim Hyo-saeng
 Yang Hyun-min as Yangchon Gwon Geun
 Gil Jung-woo as Jeong Gi-jun – son of Jeong Do-jeon's younger brother, Jeong Do-gwang

People around Boon-yi 
 Jeon Mi-seon as Gannan/Yeon-hyang, Boon-yi's mother

People around Ddang-sae 
 Jeong Yu-mi as Yeon-hee
 Park Si-eun as young Yeon-hee
 Lee Cho-hee as Gap-boon
 Kwak Ji-hye as young Gap-boon
 Seo Hyun-chul as Jang Sam-bong

People around Moo-hyul 
 Seo Yi-sook as Myo-sang, Moo-hyul's grandmother
 Lee Jun-hyeok as Hong Dae-hong, Moo-hyul's martial arts teacher

People around Yi Seong-gye 
 Lee Soon-jae as Yi Ja-chun, Yi Seong-gye's father (cameo)
 Kim Hee-jung as Madam Kang (later Queen Sindeok), Yi Seong-gye's second wife
 Seo Dong-won as Yi Bang-gwa (later King Jeongjong), Yi Seong-gye's second son
 Lee Seung-hyo as Yi Bang-u (later Grand Prince Jinan), Yi Seong-gye's first son
 Kang Shin-hyo as Yi Bang-gan (later Grand Prince Hoean), Yi Seong-gye's fourth son
 Kim Sang-woo as young Yi Bang-gan
 Jung Jae-min as Yi Bang-ui (later Grand Prince Ik-an), Yi Seong-gye's third son
 Park Si-jin as Yi Bang-beon (later Grand Prince Muan), Yi Seong-gye's seventh son
 Kim Ye-june as young Yi Bang-beon
 Jung Yoon-seok as Yi Bang-seok (later Crown Prince Uian), Yi Seong-gye's eighth son
 Lee Seung-woo as young Yi Bang-seok
 Kim Ji-eun as Yi Bang-gan's wife

Joseon court officials 
 Park Hae-soo as Yi Ji-ran, Yi Seong-gye's sworn brother
 Jo Hee-bong as Hojeong Ha Ryun
 Kwon Hwa-woon as Hwang Hui
 Lee Myeong-haeng as Jo Jun

Goryeo peoples 
 Jeon Guk-hwan as Choe Yeong
 Lee Hyun-bae as King U
 Hwang Jae-won as King Chang
 Lee Do-yeop as King Gongyang
 Han Ye-ri as Yoon Rang/Cheok Sa-gwang
 Park Hoon as Cheok In-gwang, Cheok Sa-gwang's brother
 Yoon Seo-hyun as Woo Hak-joo
 Choi Jong-hwan as Jo Min-soo
 Ahn Gil-kang as Jo So-saeng	
 Choi Jong-won as Yi In-gyeom
 Jeon No-min as Hong In-bang
 Jung Doo-hong as Hong Ryun
 Jung Moon-sung as Han Goo-young
 Heo Joon-seok as Dae-geun
 Park Hyuk-kwon as Gil Tae-mi/Gil Sun-mi
 Park Sung-hoon as Gil Yoo, Gil Tae-mi's son
 Kim Jong-soo as Yi Saek

Others 
 Lee Ji-hoon as Heo Kang/Yi Shin-jeok
 Park Min-jung as Heuk-cheop Seon-hwa
 Yoon Son-ha as Cho-young
 Han Sang-jin as Monk Jukryong
 Kim Ha-kyun as Baek Yoon
 Yang Kyung-won as Ahn-won
 Ahn Suk-hwan as Teacher Yooksan
 Yeo Hoe-hyun as Sungkyunkwan student
 Jeon Sung-woo as Sungkyunkwan student
 Jeon Jin-seo as Eun-ho, King Gongyang's son

Ratings
In the table below, the blue numbers represent the lowest ratings and the red numbers represent the highest ratings.

Awards and nominations

References

External links
 

Seoul Broadcasting System television dramas
2015 South Korean television series debuts
Korean-language television shows
South Korean historical television series
Television series set in Goryeo
Television series set in the Joseon dynasty
2016 South Korean television series endings
Martial arts television series
Television shows written by Kim Young-hyun
Television series set in the 14th century